The 2012 Formula D season (officially titled Formula Drift Pro Championship) was the ninth season of the Formula D series. The season began on April 6 in Long Beach and ended on October 13 at Toyota Speedway at Irwindale.

Schedule

Championship standings
Event winners in bold.

External links 
 Official Formula D Website

Formula D seasons
Formula D